Drew Gooden (born October 26, 1993) is an American commentary YouTuber who makes videos on internet celebrities, internet culture, and pop culture. , his YouTube channel has over 3.9 million subscribers.

Before becoming a YouTuber, Gooden was a Viner best known for his "Road Work Ahead" Vine. He often collaborates with fellow YouTuber Danny Gonzalez and the two went on the We Are Two Different People Tour in 2019. In 2021, Gooden won the Streamy Award for Commentary.

Personal life
Drew Gooden was born on October 26, 1993 in North Carolina, and has lived in Orlando, Florida since moving there at a young age. Growing up, Gooden wanted to write for Saturday Night Live.

Gooden met Amanda Murphy in 2015 after she commented on one of his Vines and they started a long-distance relationship for over a year. The two got engaged in 2016 and married on March 10, 2019.

Internet career

Vine (2013–2017) 
After dropping out of community college two times and taking improv classes, Gooden joined Vine, a six-second video platform, in 2013. Gooden's videos ("Vines") were short comedy sketches—his first viral Vine depicted a Venn diagram of him and his favorite shirt, which both had in common a "mortal enemy" in Jeff Daniels. He described Vines as spontaneous, "the video equivalent of a tweet".

Gooden created what would become his most popular Vine in 2016. On the way to work in Arizona, he asked his girlfriend to record him driving past a "Road Work Ahead" sign and saying, "Road work ahead? Uh, yeah. I sure hope it does." The meme would later be described as one of the "most recognizable videos on the internet", although The Atlantic also called it "passably funny". Gooden remained known for the Vine several years later, calling it his "catchphrase" and selling merchandise based on it; he was recognized at VidCon as the "Road Work Ahead guy". However, he also found it annoying and wanted to separate himself from the video. According to him, the Vine was never as popular when Vine was still active but spread through Vine compilations on YouTube.

Gooden appeared in the Vine-produced web series Camp Unplug (2016), where he first met fellow Viner Danny Gonzalez. By the time Vine closed in January 2017, Gooden had amassed several hundred thousand followers. Besides a small Twitter account, he had no other online followings and decided to migrate to YouTube alongside many other Viners.

YouTube (2017–present) 

Gooden experimented with different formats and types of videos. As he had wanted to transition to longform content, Gooden's initial idea was to create longer comedy sketches that were similar to his Vines. He eventually settled on being a commentary and reaction YouTuber and his following slowly began to rise again. Gooden's breakout video was a highly critical review of Jake Paul's live show, uploaded in June 2018. Unlike his other videos, which then averaged one hundred thousand views, the review was viewed four million times in one month. He reached one million subscribers in October 2018.

Gonzalez also started a commentary channel on YouTube and the two began traveling to appear in each other's videos, becoming close friends. Gooden said that making videos with Gonzalez was more enjoyable because they did not require a script. A running joke between their fans is that they pretend to confuse the two YouTubers together. This inspired their We Are Two Different People Tour in 2019, with YouTuber Kurtis Conner as a guest star. The tour, with music, effects, and theatrical elements interspersed with sketches and comedy routines, was their first major live performance and ran from September to October. The two also released a parody song called "We Are Not The Same Person" to promote the tour.

Gooden was a Featured Creator at the 10th Annual VidCon. Three years after starting YouTube, Gooden began creating content full-time. In 2021, he won a Streamy Award in Commentary. Gooden was nominated in the same category the next year but lost to Gonzalez.

Content and reception 
Gooden is a commentary YouTuber. His videos mainly consist of "deep dives" into YouTube, internet, and pop culture. Topics of discussion in Gooden's videos have included the difficulties faced by internet celebrities (Lilly Singh) attempting to break into mainstream media, Jake and Logan Paul, TikTok creators, and movie reviews. 

His videos contain comedic elements and comedy sketches, and are filmed in his house. Paste described his videos as his "own comedic version of investigative journalism". He often shares his personal experiences in his videos, and discusses how online trends may be harmful, such as when he examines dangerous videos on YouTube aimed at children. Gooden was criticized by Kaitlyn Tiffany of The Atlantic for an advertisement in the middle of one of his videos, but he has said that he is careful not to be hypocritical as he has criticized celebrities for excessive advertising.

Roles

Awards and nominations

References

Primary sources

Further reading

External links 
 Official channel
 
 @drewisgooden at Twitter
 @drewisgooden at Vine (archived)
 Interview with WIRED – via YouTube.

1993 births
Living people
21st-century American comedians
American YouTubers
American male comedians
Comedians from Florida
Comedy YouTubers
Commentary YouTubers
People from Orlando, Florida
Vine (service) celebrities